The British Journal of American Legal Studies is a peer-reviewed journal devoted to United States law, and based in the United Kingdom. It was founded in 2012, and publishes articles related to constitutional law in the United States, including human rights, legal and political theory, socio-legal studies, and legal history.

External links
Homepage
Issues

American law journals
British law journals